Mahsa Abdolzadeh  (born 22 September 1985) is an Austrian politician for the Green Party in Vienna and a political scientist. She is a feminist and an activist for women, LGBTQ, and minority rights.

Early life and career 
Abdolzadeh was born during the Iran-Iraq War in Tabriz, Iran, and grew up in both Tehran and Vienna. She later moved to live solely in Vienna, in 2004. She has earned a master's degree in Political science from The University of Vienna in 2013 whilst studying child social work in a private college in Vienna.

After completing her studies, she published a book depicting women movements in Iran. This text has been one of the most notable works in German academia, concerning women's rights in Iran. She has published numerous articles in the German and Persian languages, primarily about feminism in Europe and the Middle East, European Immigration Politics, and the negative effects of fundamentalist Islamic education among the Jihad.

She initially started her work in sales management, later becoming a social worker. After her studies, she became a women's adviser for the Green Party in Vienna. As of 2015, she is an elected politician for the Green Party in the 19th district of Vienna.

Publications 
 (2014)  (Hamburg Kovac)

References 

Politicians from Tabriz
21st-century Austrian women politicians
21st-century Austrian politicians
Austrian LGBT rights activists
Austrian feminists
1985 births
Living people
The Greens – The Green Alternative politicians